Maureen Leianuhea "Anu" Kelly (born September 26, 1993) is an American woman who disappeared on the evening of June 9, 2013 at the Canyon Creek Campground, located in Gifford Pinchot National Forest in Skamania County, Washington. According to a group of friends who were at the campground with Kelly, she stated she was going on a "spiritual quest" and subsequently removed her clothes and walked into the woods wearing only a fanny pack containing knives, matches and a compass. No one tried to stop her.

Investigation 
The Skamania County Sheriff's Department stated that Kelly's friends reported her missing shortly after midnight in the early hours of Monday, June 10. A search was initiated later that day and continued throughout the week. Several crews of investigators and volunteers were dispatched to look for Maureen Kelly, where they discovered a deep, unforgiving terrain filled with heavy timber and brush. Bare footprints matching Kelly's shoe size were found crossing Canyon Creek and climbing the opposite bank to Forest Road 54, where the trail was lost. K-9 units were reportedly unable to pick up a trace. By Monday night, temperatures in the area had dropped to the mid-40s with light precipitation, sufficient to cause hypothermia in a nude adult. To this day, police have not recovered Maureen Kelly or her remains. Nor did they find evidence of foul play.

See also
List of people who disappeared

References 

1993 births
2010s missing person cases
Missing person cases in Washington (state)
People from Vancouver, Washington
Unexplained disappearances
Possibly living people
History of women in Washington (state)
Gifford Pinchot National Forest
2013 in Washington (state)